Edirnespor is the football team of Edirne, Turkey and her colours are yellow and red. Founded in 1966 In the beginning of 1990s Edirnespor was playing in the Turkish 2nd League. One season, they became second in their league and qualified for Play-offs but they didn't manage to play in Turkish Super League.They are currently playing in Turkish 3rd League

References

External links
Edirnespor on TFF.org

 
Sport in Edirne
Football clubs in Turkey